Blenda is the heroine of a Swedish legend (Blendasägnen) from Småland.

Blenda may also refer to:

People 
 Blenda Gay (1950–1976), murdered American footballer
 Blenda Ljungberg (1907–1994), Swedish politician
 Blenda Wilson (born 1941), American university administrator

Other uses 
Blenda (opera), 1876 Swedish opera by Per August Ölander
 Blenda, Podlaskie Voivodeship, a village in Poland
 Blenda, a Norwegian laundry product made by Lilleborg